Internal Affairs is a 1990 American crime thriller film directed by Mike Figgis and stars Richard Gere and Andy García. 

Set in Los Angeles the film follows the police department's Internal Affairs Division as they investigate an officer who may be using his colleagues as pawns for his own nefarious purposes. Internal Affairs agent Raymond Avilla becomes obsessed with catching him.

Plot
During a drug bust, LAPD officers Dennis Peck and Van Stretch assault a dealer and his girlfriend. Outside, fellow patrolman Dorian Fletcher shoots a man running towards him, only to discover that he was unarmed. Peck plants a knife on the body to get the distraught Fletcher off the hook.

Raymond Avilla joins the LAPD's Internal Affairs Division (IAD) and is partnered with Amy Wallace to investigate the drug bust. They learn that Stretch abuses drugs, has a history of using excessive force, and may be corrupt. Stretch is also revealed to be abusive to his wife Penny, whom he suspects of infidelity, and has a subservient friendship with Peck. Avilla begins to look into Peck, who is held up as an LAPD role model but whose lifestyle (including wife Heather and spousal support for three ex-wives and eight children) is hard to explain with only a patrolman's salary. After an altercation with Peck, Fletcher agrees to help Avilla's investigation.

Meanwhile, Peck not only has a widespread web of corruption based on extortion, favors to cops and criminals alike and complicit dealings with pimps, he also moonlights as a hitman. Businessman Steven Arrocas offers Peck $15,000 to kill his parents, with Peck angrily demanding a higher sum.

Avilla pressures Stretch to provide evidence against Peck in return for immunity from prosecution. Stretch calls Penny and tells her he will testify, unaware that Peck is having sex with her at that very moment. During a routine patrol, Stretch is shot through the chest in a hit staged by Peck. Peck murders the gunman but the van used in the hit speeds away, indicating a witness to the crime. When Stretch is revealed to be alive, Peck strangles him but makes it look as though he's holding on to a dead friend when the ambulance arrives. Avilla and Wallace set up a sting to catch the witness, but two SWAT units arrive on the scene after the sting is leaked. Fletcher and the witness, Demetrio, are killed in the resulting shootout. As he dies in Avilla's arms, Demetrio identifies Peck as Stretch's killer.

Avilla's marriage has been wilting due to his increased obsession with the case. Unrelated, Peck had insinuated he would make advances on Avilla's wife, Kathleen. After the Demetrio incident, now aware that Avilla is tailing him, Peck meets Kathleen in a public place, posing as an IAD investigator and feigning worries about Avilla's wellbeing. This angers Avilla, who has an outburst at the office. He is taken off-guard in the elevator and beaten by Peck, who deceitfully boasts that he seduced and pleasured Kathleen. Avilla then has a violent public confrontation with Kathleen. The two make up the following morning when Kathleen convinces Avilla that she would have left him rather than ever cheat on him.

As the IAD net tightens around Peck, they discover his many wives' inexplicable real estate holdings are handled by Penny Stretch. Penny refuses to cooperate with IAD but Wallace correctly guesses her affair with Peck. Breaking under pressure, Heather tells Avilla and Wallace that two recent murder victims share the same surname as a Steven Arrocas who had contacted her husband. Meanwhile, Arrocas himself walks in on Peck having rough sex with his wife. Peck nonchalantly confirms that the contract killing of Arrocas's parents has been fulfilled and tries to goad Arrocas into killing his wife, but Arrocas shoots Peck in the foot instead. Avilla and Wallace show up shortly thereafter, finding the dead bodies of the Arrocases.

Peck is hiding and shoots Wallace, badly wounding her, then flees. Wallace tells Avila and the ambulance driver that Peck shot her, ensuring a witness other than Avila to Peck's identification. Avilla rushes home to find Peck holding Kathleen hostage. As he is beaten and shot in the leg by Avilla, Peck proudly boasts his ability to manipulate him and disingenuously ascribes his corruption and sociopathy to the need to provide for his offspring. Unwilling to go to prison, Peck pulls a knife out of his boot and lunges at Avilla, who shoots him dead.

Cast

In addition, Annabella Sciorra portrays Peck's wife, Heather.

Reception
Internal Affairs was well received by critics; review aggregator Rotten Tomatoes gives it an 81% "Fresh" rating based on 31 reviews. Janet Maslin of The New York Times said, "Internal Affairs is, for the dim movie season that is traditionally January, an unusually bright light."

The film is included in The New York Times Guide to the Best 1,000 Movies Ever Made, based on reviews written in The New York Times from 1929 to 1998.

Box office
The movie was a moderate success but performed better on home video. It grossed $27.7 million in the United States and Canada and $20 million internationally for a worldwide gross of $47.7 million.

References

External links 

 

1990 films
1990 crime thriller films
1990s crime drama films
1990s thriller drama films
American crime thriller films
American crime drama films
American thriller drama films
Films directed by Mike Figgis
Paramount Pictures films
1990s Spanish-language films
Fictional portrayals of the Los Angeles Police Department
Films set in the 1980s
Films set in the 1990s
Films scored by Anthony Marinelli
American police detective films
1990 drama films
1990s English-language films
1990s American films